Calcomp plotters (sometimes referred to as CalComp plotters) were the best known products of the California Computer Products company (Calcomp or CalComp).

Overview
The Calcomp 565 drum plotter, introduced in 1959, was one of the first computer graphics output devices sold. The pen was pressed by a spring against paper scrolling across the drum. A solenoid could lift the pen off the paper. This arrangement allowed line drawings to be made under computer control.

A metal bar above the take-up reel allowed a finished plot to be torn off and removed. The drum would then be advanced using the manual controls and the fresh paper end taped to the take-up reel. The standard pen was a ball-point, but liquid ink pens were available, and typically were used for higher quality plots intended for publication. Other paper stock could be taped to the drum if desired. A chart drive switch was provided to turn off the motorized paper supply and take-up reels for this purpose.

IBM
IBM marketed the Calcomp 565 as its IBM 1627 for use with its low-end scientific computers, first the IBM 1620, and, later, the IBM 1130.  It was perhaps the first non-IBM peripheral that IBM allowed to be attached to one of its computers.

A Calcomp plotter attached to an IBM 1401 was used to develop Bresenham's line algorithm in 1962.

References

External links
Programming Calcomp Electromechanical Plotters
Photo of Calcomp 565 plotter at Stuttgart Computer Museum
Picture of a Calcomp 565
Calcomp 563 Incremental Plotter Information
A working Calcomp 565 on Youtube.com
Animated diagram of Calcomp 565/563 pen assembly

Pen plotters
Computer-related introductions in 1959